Enea Mihaj (born 5 July 1998) is an Albanian professional footballer who plays as a centre back for Primeira Liga club Famalicão and the Albania national team.

Early life
Mihaj was born in Albania. He later moved with his family to Thessaloniki, Greece, and then to Rhodes, Greece, where he discovered his interest in football. At the age of 13 he was admitted to Olympic Arena Academy where he stood out with his talent and caught the eye of Panetolikos, which signed him to their academy. At the age of 16, he moved to Aetolia-Acarnania to focus on football.

Club career

Panetolikos
Mihaj first suited up for Panetolikos on 14 December 2016 in a 2016–17 Greek Cup match against Kallithea where he was an unused substitute. After two league matches as an unused substitute, Mihaj made his professional debut on 11 January 2017 in a cup match against PAOK, coming on as a substitute in the 87th minute in place of Giorgos Mygas.

PAOK
On 21 June 2019, Mihaj signed with PAOK. On 12 July 2020, he scored his first goal for PAOK in 1–0 away victory against Olympiacos in the 90th minute.

International career

Albania
Mihaj received his first call up to the Albania national under-19 team for the friendly tournament Roma Caput Mundi from 29 February–4 March 2016.

He received a call up at the Albania national under-21 football team for the 2017 UEFA European Under-21 Championship qualification match against Israel under-21 on 10 October 2016. He debuted in that match, coming on as a substitute at half-time in place of Kostandin Kariqi.

He was called up again to Albania's under-21 side for a double friendly match against Moldova under-21 on 25 and 27 March 2017.

Career statistics

Club

Honours

Club
PAOK 
Greek Cup: 2020–21  ;Runner-Up :2021–22

References

External links

1998 births
Living people
People from Rhodes
Albania youth international footballers
Albania under-21 international footballers
Greek footballers
Greek people of Albanian descent
Albanian emigrants to Greece
Albanian footballers
Association football defenders
Super League Greece players
Panetolikos F.C. players
PAOK FC players
Albania international footballers
Sportspeople from the South Aegean